The Centro de Estudios Conservacionistas (CECON; Center for Conservation Studies) is a scientific research institute of the San Carlos University of Guatemala (USAC).  
The center was created in August 1981, and since February 1982 has been administratively attached to USAC's faculty of chemistry and pharmacy.

The "Protected Areas Unit" of CECON manages a number of nature reserves, including:
 Mario Dary Rivera Protected Biotope, better known as "Biotopo del Quetzal", located in Salamá, Baja Verapaz.
 Chocón Machacas Protected Biotope in Livingston, Izabal.
 Cerro Cahuí Protected Biotope 
 San Miguel la Palotada (El Zotz) Protected Biotope
 Naachtún-Dos Lagunas Protected Biotope
 El Tigre Protected Biotope in Petén
 Monterrico Multiple use area in Monterrico, Santa Rosa.

References

External links
Biotopos administrados por el CECON 
Centro de Datos para la conservación, CECON, USAC 

Research institutes in Guatemala
Environmental research institutes
1981 establishments in Guatemala